James William Hanson (born 10 November 1995) is an English professional footballer who plays as a defender or midfielder. He last played for League One club Oxford United.

Club career

Derby County 
Hanson was a product of the Derby County academy with more than ten years at the club. He made his Football League debut for the Rams on 14 March 2015, starting against Norwich City in a 1–1 away draw at Carrow Road. In the 66th minute, with Derby 1–0 down, he swung in a corner kick and seemed to have scored the equalizing goal on his debut, but it was given as an own goal by Norwich goalkeeper John Ruddy, who fumbled it over the line. Derby later appealed the decision with the Football League, and the goal was credited to Hanson on 19 March, meaning that he had scored for the club on his professional debut. He played one more match in the 2014–15 season, playing 70 minutes in a 1–0 home defeat to Middlesbrough on 17 March.

Hanson played more regularly in the 2015–16 season; his first appearance came on 15 August, when he played for 90 minutes in a 1–1 draw against Charlton Athletic, at the base of Derby's midfield three. He started again on 18 August against Middlesbrough but had to be withdrawn after 39 minutes because of injury. He missed the next match because of it, but returned for the following match, a 2–1 home defeat to Leeds United on 29 August. He signed a new three-year contract with Derby on 7 September after which he made five more league appearances, all of them as a substitute.

Oxford United
Hanson signed for Oxford United on 9 August 2018, for an undisclosed fee, on a four-year contract. He made his debut in a 4–1 away defeat at Portsmouth in League One, conceding a penalty that was saved by keeper Jonathan Mitchell. Hanson was released by the club upon the end of his contract at the end of the 2021–22 season.

International career
On 19 March 2015, Hanson was named in the England under-20 squad for the first time, by manager Aidy Boothroyd, to face Mexico and the United States.

Career statistics

References

External links

1995 births
Living people
Sportspeople from Burton upon Trent
English footballers
England youth international footballers
Association football defenders
Derby County F.C. players
Wigan Athletic F.C. players
Oxford United F.C. players
English Football League players